Murici Futebol Clube is a Brazilian professional football club based in Murici, Alagoas. It competes in the Campeonato Alagoano, the top flight of the Alagoas state football league.

History
The club was founded on 7 September 1974. Murici won the Campeonato Alagoano once, in 2010.

Achievements
Campeonato Alagoano: 1
2010

Runner-up in 2010: Agremiação Sportiva Arapiraquense

 Campeonato Alagoano Second Level:
 Winners (1): 1998

Runner-up in 2010: Jacyobá Atlético Clube

Stadium
Murici Futebol Clube play their home games at Estádio José Gomes da Costa. The stadium has a maximum capacity of 3,000 people.

References

Football clubs in Alagoas
Association football clubs established in 1974
1974 establishments in Brazil